The 2014–15 Iraqi Premier League was the 41st season of the Iraqi Premier League since its establishment in 1974. The season started on 30 September 2014 and ended on 11 July 2015. The league was played in a group stage format for the first time since the 2010–11 season.

Newly-promoted side Naft Al-Wasat, founded in 2008, won the league in their first ever season in the top-flight, defeating Al-Quwa Al-Jawiya in the final 6–5 on penalties after a 0–0 draw.

Name changes
Baghdad renamed to Amanat Baghdad.

Group stage

Group 1

Results

Group 2

Results

Elite stage

Group 1

Group 2

Championship play-off

|-
!colspan="3"|Third place match

|-
!colspan="3"|Final

Third place match

Al-Shorta were awarded a 3–0 victory as Al-Minaa did not turn up for the game.

Match officials
Assistant referees:
Haider Abdul Hassan
Ahmad Sabah Qasem
Fourth official: Ahmed Juma

Match rules
90 minutes.
30 minutes of extra-time if necessary.
Penalty shootout if scores still level.

Final

Match officials
Assistant referees:
Muayad Mohammed Ali
Wathik Mdallal Obaid Al-Swaiedi
Fourth official: Wathik Mohammed Al-Baag

Match rules
90 minutes.
30 minutes of extra-time if necessary.
Penalty shootout if scores still level.

Final positions

Season statistics

Top scorers

Hat-tricks

See also
 Tournament for the Iraqi Armed Forces

References

External links
 Iraq Football Association

Iraqi Premier League seasons
1
Iraq